Vollertsen is a surname. Notable people with the surname include:

Frank Vollertsen (born 1958), German scientist
Julie Vollertsen (born 1959), American volleyball player and coach
Norbert Vollertsen (born 1958), German physician and human rights activist